Ashley Cummins (born August 2, 1987) is an American mixed martial artist who competes in the Atomweight division. She has previously fought in Invicta FC.

Personal life
Cummins started martial arts as a child with karate. She continued as a practitioner until she reached 18 years old. It was later that she started Brazilian Jiu-Jitsu, muay thai and boxing.

She currently works as a police officer and animal rescuer for the St. Louis Metropolitan Police Department.

Mixed martial arts career

Early career
Cummins was scheduled to make her professional debut against Chelsea Colarelli at XFN 5, for Colarelli's XFL Strawweight title. Her debut came after a successful amateur career, during which she went on a perfect 8–0 run. Cummins won the fight by a fifth-round rear-naked choke, following a back-and-forth fight.

Cummins was scheduled to fight Stephanie Frausto at NAAFS: Caged Fury 16. She won the fight by a unanimous decision.

Invicta FC

Invicta FC Strawweight career
Cummins was scheduled to make her debut with Invicta FC at their very first event, against Sofia Bagherdai. She won the fight by unanimous decision.

In her second fight with the organization, Cummins was scheduled to fight Joanne Calderwood at Invicta FC 3: Penne vs. Sugiyama. Cummins lost the fight by a first-round knockout. Cummins lost vision in one of her eyes during the bout, as a results of a punch, which didn't return following the end of the fight. The injury required surgery, with her vision returning two months later.

Following her eye surgery, Cummins returned to fight Emily Kagan at Invicta FC 6: Cyborg vs. Coenen 2. Cummins lost the fight by split decision, although the majority of media members awarded her the victory.

Cummins was scheduled to fight Alexa Grasso at Invicta FC 8: Waterson vs. Tamada. Grasso won by unanimous decision, extending Cummins' losing streak to three fights.

She briefly left Invicta to fight Nicole Smith at Bellator 157: Dynamite 2. Cummins won the fight by submission.

Invicta FC Atomweight career
In her next fight, Cummins moved down to atomweight to fight Amber Brown at Invicta FC 22: Evinger vs. Kunitskaya II. Brown was likewise moving down to atomweight from strawweight. Cummins won the fight by unanimous decision. This victory earned Cummins a "Performance of the Night" award.

After her successful atomweight debut, Cummins was scheduled to fight the one-time Invicta Atomweight title challenger Jinh Yu Frey at Invicta FC 24: Dudieva vs. Borella. Frey won the fight by unanimous decision, winning all three rounds of a bout that consisted mostly of grappling exchanges.

Cummins was scheduled to fight Stephanie Alba at Invicta FC 27: Kaufman vs. Kianzad. She won the fight by unanimous decision.

Cummins fought Jéssica Delboni at Invicta FC 32: Spencer vs. Sorenson in a potential number-one challenger bout. She won the fight by unanimous decision.

Her last two victories earned Cummins the chance to fight a rematch with the reigning Invicta Atomweight champion Jinh Yu Frey at Invicta FC 39: Frey vs. Cummins II. Frey came into the bout 0.8 lbs over the title limit of 105 lbs, which resulted in her being stripped of the championship belt and only Cummins being elligeble to win the title. Frey won the fight by unanimous decision.

Due to Frey missing weight, the Invicta FC Atomweight title was left vacant. A rematch was impossible, as Frey signed with the UFC in the meantime. As a results of all this, Cummmins was scheduled to fight Alesha Zappitella for the vacant title at Invicta FC 42: Cummins vs. Zappitella. Cummins was the more dominant party throughout the first two rounds, winning the majority of striking exchanges and stopping Zappitella's takedowns. In the first minute of the third round, Zappitella managed to land an early takedown and countered Cummins' guillotine choke attempt with a Von Flue choke. It was the first Von Flue choke finish in Invicta FC history.

Bellator MMA 
Cummins is scheduled to face Randi Field on March 31, 2023 at Bellator 293.

Championships and accomplishments 
Xtreme Fighting League
XFL Strawweight Championship
Invicta Fighting Championships
Performance of the Night (One Time)  vs. Amber Brown

Mixed martial arts record

 
|-
| Loss
|align=center|7–6
| Alesha Zappitella
| Submission (Von Flue choke)
| Invicta FC 42: Cummins vs. Zappitella
| 
|align=center| 4
|align=center| 1:20
| Kansas City, Kansas, United States
|
|-
| Loss
|align=center|7–5
| Jinh Yu Frey
| Decision (unanimous)
| Invicta FC 39: Frey vs. Cummins II
| 
|align=center| 5
|align=center| 5:00
| Kansas City, Kansas, United States
|
|-
| Win
|align=center|7–4
| Jéssica Delboni
| Decision (unanimous)
| Invicta FC 32: Spencer vs. Sorenson
| 
|align=center| 3
|align=center| 5:00
| Shawnee, Oklahoma, United States
|
|-
| Win
|align=center|6–4
| Stephanie Alba
| Decision (unanimous)
| Invicta FC 27: Kaufman vs. Kianzad
| 
|align=center| 3
|align=center| 5:00
| Kansas City, Missouri, United States
|
|-
| Loss
|align=center|5–4
| Jinh Yu Frey
| Decision (unanimous)
| Invicta FC 24: Dudieva vs. Borella
| 
|align=center| 3
|align=center| 5:00
| Kansas City, Missouri, United States
|
|-
| Win
|align=center|5–3
| Amber Brown
| Decision (unanimous)
| Invicta FC 22: Evinger vs. Kunitskaya II
| 
|align=center| 3
|align=center| 5:00
| Kansas City, Missouri, United States
| Atomweight debut. Performance of the Night.
|-
| Win
|align=center|4–3
| Nicole Smith
| Submission (knee on neck)
| Bellator 157: Dynamite 2
| 
|align=center| 2
|align=center| 1:33
| St. Louis, Missouri, United States
| 
|-
| Loss
|align=center|3–3
| Alexa Grasso
| Decision (unanimous)
| Invicta FC 8: Waterson vs. Tamada
| 
|align=center| 3
|align=center| 5:00
| Kansas City, Missouri, United States
| 
|-
| Loss
|align=center|3–2
| Emily Kagan
| Decision (split)
| Invicta FC 6: Cyborg vs. Coenen 2
| 
|align=center| 3
|align=center| 5:00
| Kansas City, Missouri, United States
| 
|-
| Loss
|align=center|3–1
| Joanne Calderwood
| KO (knee to the body) 
| Invicta FC 3: Penne vs. Sugiyama
| 
|align=center| 1
|align=center| 3:13 
| Kansas City, Kansas, United States
| 
|- 
| Win
|align=center|3–0
| Sofia Bagherdai
| Decision (unanimous)
| Invicta FC 1: Coenen vs. Ruyssen
| 
|align=center| 3
|align=center| 5:00
| Kansas City, Kansas, United States
| 120 lbs catchweight bout.
|-
| Win
|align=center| 2–0
| Stephanie Frausto
| Decision (unanimous)
| NAAFS - Caged Fury 16
| 
|align=center| 3
|align=center| 3:00
| Morgantown, West Virginia, United States
| 
|-
| Win
|align=center|1–0
| Chelsea Colarelli
| Submission (rear-naked choke)
| XFL - Xtreme Fight Night 5
| 
|align=center| 5
|align=center| 1:41
| Tulsa, Oklahoma
| Strawweight debut.

See also
 List of female mixed martial artists

References

External links
 
 Ashley Cummins at Invicta FC
 
 

1987 births
Living people
Atomweight mixed martial artists
American female mixed martial artists
Strawweight mixed martial artists
Mixed martial artists utilizing Muay Thai
Mixed martial artists utilizing boxing
Mixed martial artists utilizing Brazilian jiu-jitsu
Mixed martial artists from Missouri
People from St. Louis County, Missouri
American Muay Thai practitioners
Female Muay Thai practitioners
American practitioners of Brazilian jiu-jitsu
Female Brazilian jiu-jitsu practitioners
American women police officers
21st-century American women